Zee TV (stylised as ZEE TV) is a Hindi general entertainment pay television channel in India. It was launched on 2 October 1992, as the first privately owned TV channel in the country. It is owned by Zee Entertainment Enterprises. Zee TV also launched in the UK in 1995.
Zee TV also launched in USA in Oct 1998.

History 

Zee TV was launched on 2 October 1992, as the flagship channel of the Zee Telefilms Ltd. It began full-day broadcasts in 1993.  It is the first private TV channel in India. On 10 January 2007, Zee Telefilms Ltd was renamed into the Zee Entertainment Enterprises Ltd (ZEEL.).

In 2013, Zee TV, along with its sister channels, went over a branding overhaul.

On 15 October 2017, coinciding Zee's twenty-five year silver jubilee, all of its channels rebranded.

On 30 May 2021, Zee TV planned to revamp its look and air four new television series, but because of the COVID-19 pandemic in India, it was postponed.

Programming 

The channel mostly airs content intended for family and coming-of-age generations ranging from comedy to drama. It has also aired reality shows such as En Vidya Nokki, Sa Re Ga Ma Pa, I Can Do That, India's Best Cinestars Ki Khoj, and Dance India Dance.

Zee Rishtey Awards 
Since 2007, the channel has presented an annual award show, the Zee Rishtey Awards, to performers on its show based on their popularity. Nominations for the awards are declared by the channel. The winners are selected through voting that is made online and through SMS.

References

External links
 

Foreign television channels broadcasting in the United Kingdom
Hindi-language television channels in India
Television channels and stations established in 1992
Television stations in Mumbai
Hindi-language television stations
Zee Entertainment Enterprises
Television stations in South Africa
1992 establishments in Maharashtra